A tax holiday is a temporary reduction or elimination of a tax. It is synonymous with tax abatement, tax subsidy or tax reduction. Governments usually create tax holidays as incentives for business investment. Tax relief can be provided in the form of property tax concessions to assure the investment of new businesses or the retention of existing ones.  Tax holidays have been granted by governments at national, sub-national, and local levels, and have included income, property, sales, VAT, and other taxes. Some tax holidays are extra-statutory concessions, where governing bodies grant a reduction in tax that is not necessarily authorized within the law. In developing countries, governments sometimes reduce or eliminate corporate taxes for the purpose of attracting foreign direct investment or stimulating growth in selected industries.

A tax holiday may be granted to particular activities, in particular to develop a given area of business, or to particular taxpayers. Researchers found that on sales tax holidays, households increase the quantities of clothing and shoes bought by over 49% and 45%, respectively, relative to what they buy on average.

Sales tax holidays in the United States

In New York, a statewide sales tax holiday was first enacted by the New York legislature in 1996, enabling the first tax-free week in January 1997. Local governments in New York were given the option of whether or not to participate; most declined. Since then, the initiative has been adopted by thirteen states. It commonly takes the form of tax-free weekend lasting Friday through Sunday, usually during a major shopping period for necessities, such as just before school starts. During that period, sales tax is not collected on selected items, such as clothing and school supplies. The items subject to the sales tax exemption may also be restricted by price (e.g., clothing up to $100), but consumers are free to buy unlimited quantities of the included items.

As with other sales taxes, visiting residents of non-participating states who purchase tax-free goods (holiday or not) may still have to pay use tax on the goods they take home.

Five US states (Alaska, Delaware, Montana, New Hampshire, and Oregon) do not impose general sales taxes at all but may have excise taxes on specific categories of goods such as gasoline, E911, cigarettes, alcohol, or meals. See Sales taxes in the United States for details.

Some governments create tax-free weekends as incentives for business investment.

References

External links

 2008 State Sales Tax Holidays  – Federation of Tax Administrators
 http://www.window.state.tx.us/taxinfo/taxpubs/tx98_490/tx98_490.html
 Sales Tax Holiday
 Tax Free Weekend 

 Alabama
 Connecticut
 District of Columbia
 Georgia
 Iowa
 Louisiana
 Missouri
 New Mexico
 North Carolina
 Oklahoma
 South Carolina
 Tennessee 
 Texas
 Vermont
 Virginia
 West Virginia

Tax policy